Things Fall Apart is the debut novel by Nigerian author Chinua Achebe, first published in 1958. It depicts pre-colonial life in the southeastern part of Nigeria and the invasion by Europeans during the late 19th century. It is seen as the archetypal modern African novel in English, and one of the first to receive global critical acclaim. It is a staple book in schools throughout Africa and is widely read and studied in English-speaking countries around the world. The novel was first published in the UK in 1962 by William Heinemann Ltd, and became the first work published in Heinemann's African Writers Series.

The novel follows the life of Okonkwo, an Igbo ("Ibo" in the novel) man and local wrestling champion in the fictional Nigerian clan of Umuofia. The work is split into three parts, with the first describing his family, personal history, and the customs and society of the Igbo, and the second and third sections introducing the influence of European colonialism and Christian missionaries on Okonkwo, his family, and the wider Igbo community.

Things Fall Apart was followed by a sequel, No Longer at Ease (1960), originally written as the second part of a larger work along with Arrow of God (1964). Achebe states that his two later novels A Man of the People (1966) and Anthills of the Savannah (1987), while not featuring Okonkwo's descendants, are spiritual successors to the previous novels in chronicling African history.

Plot

Part 1
The novel's protagonist, Okonkwo, is famous in the villages of Umuofia for being a wrestling champion, defeating a wrestler nicknamed "Amalinze The Cat" (because he never lands on his back). Okonkwo is strong, hard-working, and strives to show no weakness. He wants to dispel his father Unoka's tainted legacy of unpaid debts, a neglected wife and children, and cowardice at the sight of blood. Okonkwo works to build his wealth entirely on his own, as Unoka died a shameful death and left many unpaid debts. He is also obsessed with his masculinity, and any slight compromise to this is swiftly destroyed. As a result, he often beats his wives and children, and is unkind to his neighbours. However, his drive to escape the legacy of his father leads him to be wealthy, courageous, and powerful among the people of his village. He is a leader of his village, having attained a position in his society for which he has striven all his life.

Okonkwo is selected by the elders to be the guardian of Ikemefuna, a boy taken by the clan as a peace settlement between Umuofia and another clan after Ikemefuna's father killed an Umuofian woman. The boy lives with Okonkwo's family and Okonkwo grows fond of him, although Okonkwo does not show his fondness so as not to appear weak. The boy looks up to Okonkwo and considers him a second father. The Oracle of Umuofia eventually pronounces that the boy must be killed. Ezeudu, the oldest man in the village, warns Okonkwo that he should have nothing to do with the murder because it would be like killing his own child – but to avoid seeming weak and feminine to the other men of the village, Okonkwo disregards the warning from the old man, striking the killing blow himself even as Ikemefuna begs his "father" for protection. For many days after killing Ikemefuna, Okonkwo feels guilty and saddened.

Shortly after Ikemefuna's death, things begin to go wrong for Okonkwo. He falls into a great depression, as he has been greatly traumatized by the act of murdering his own adopted son. His sickly daughter Ezinma falls unexpectedly ill and it is feared she may die; during a gun salute at Ezeudu's funeral, Okonkwo's gun accidentally explodes and kills Ezeudu's son. He and his family are exiled to his motherland, the nearby village Mbanta, for seven years to appease the gods he has offended.

Part 2
While Okonkwo is away in Mbanta, he learns that white men are living in Umuofia with the intent of introducing their religion, Christianity. As the number of converts increases, the foothold of the white people grows and a new government is introduced. The village is forced to respond with either appeasement or resistance to the imposition of the white people's nascent society. Okonkwo’s son Nwoye starts getting curious about the missionaries and the new religion. After he is beaten by his father for the last time, he decides to leave his family behind and live independently. He wants to be with the missionaries because his beliefs have changed while being introduced to Christianity by the missionary, Mr. Brown. In the last year of his exile, Okonkwo instructs his best friend Obierika to sell all of his yams and hire two men to build him two huts so he can have a house to go back to with his family. He also holds a great feast for his mother's kinsmen, where an elderly attendee bemoans the current state of their tribe and its future.

Part 3
Returning from exile, Okonkwo finds his village changed by the presence of the white men. After a convert commits an evil act by unmasking an elder as he embodies an ancestral spirit of the clan, the village retaliates by destroying a local Christian church. In response, the District Commissioner representing the colonial government takes Okonkwo and several other native leaders prisoner pending payment of a fine of two hundred bags of cowries. Despite the District Commissioner's instructions to treat the leaders of Umuofia with respect, the native "court messengers" humiliate them, doing things such as shaving their heads and whipping them. As a result, the people of Umuofia finally gather for what could be a great uprising. Okonkwo, a warrior by nature and adamant about following Umuofian custom and tradition, despises any form of cowardice and advocates war against the white men. When messengers of the white government try to stop the meeting, Okonkwo beheads one of them. Because the crowd allows the other messengers to escape and does not fight alongside Okonkwo, he realizes with despair that the people of Umuofia are not going to fight to protect themselves – his society's response to such a conflict, which for so long had been predictable and dictated by tradition, is changing. The District Commissioner Gregory Irwin then comes to Okonkwo's house to take him to court, he finds that Okonkwo has hanged himself to avoid being tried in a colonial court. Among his own people, Okonkwo's actions have tarnished his reputation and status, as it is strictly against the teachings of the Igbo to commit suicide. As Irwin and his men prepare to bury Okonkwo, Irwin muses that Okonkwo's death will make an interesting chapter for his written book: "The Pacification of the Primitive Tribes of the Lower Niger."

Characters
 Okonkwo, the protagonist, has three wives and ten (total) children and becomes a leader of his clan. His father, Unoka, was weak and lazy, and Okonkwo resents him for his weaknesses: he enacts traditional masculinity. Okonkwo strives to make his way in a culture that traditionally values manliness.
 Ekwefi is Okonkwo's second wife. Although she falls in love with Okonkwo after seeing him in a wrestling match, she marries another man because Okonkwo is too poor to pay her bride price at that time. Two years later, she runs away to Okonkwo's compound one night and later marries him. She receives severe beatings from Okonkwo just like his other wives; but unlike them, she is known to talk back to Okonkwo.
 Unoka is Okonkwo's father, who defied typical Igbo masculinity by neglecting to grow yams, take care of his wives and children, and pay his debts before he dies.
 Nwoye is Okonkwo's son, about whom Okonkwo worries, fearing that he will become like Unoka. Similar to Unoka, Nwoye does not subscribe to the traditional Igbo view of masculinity being equated to violence; rather, he prefers the stories of his mother. Nwoye connects to Ikemefuna, who presents an alternative to Okonkwo's rigid masculinity. He is one of the early converts to Christianity and takes on the Christian name Isaac, an act which Okonkwo views as a final betrayal.
 Ikemefuna is a boy from the Mbaino tribe. His father murders the wife of an Umuofia man, and in the resulting settlement of the matter, Ikemefuma is put into the care of Okonkwo. By the decision of Umuofia authorities, Ikemefuna is ultimately killed, an act which Okonkwo does not prevent, and even participates in, lest he seems feminine and weak. Ikemefuna became very close to Nwoye, and Okonkwo's decision to participate in Ikemefuna's death takes a toll on Okonkwo's relationship with Nwoye.
 Ezinma is Okonkwo's favorite daughter and the only child of his wife Ekwefi. Ezinma, the Crystal Beauty, is very much the antithesis of a normal woman within the culture and Okonkwo routinely remarks that she would've made a much better boy than a girl, even wishing that she had been born as one. Ezinma often contradicts and challenges her father, which wins his adoration, affection, and respect. She is very similar to her father, and this is made apparent when she matures into a beautiful young woman who refuses to marry during her family's exile, instead choosing to help her father regain his place of respect within society.
 Obierika is Okonkwo's best friend from Umuofia. Unlike Okonkwo, Obierika thinks before he acts and is, therefore, less violent and arrogant than Okonkwo. He is considered the voice of reason in the book, and questions certain parts of their culture, such as the necessity to exile Okonkwo after he unintentionally kills a boy. Obierika's own son, Maduka, is greatly admired by Okonkwo for his wrestling prowess.  
 Chielo also called the "Oracle of the Hills and the Caves" , is the priestess of Agbala ( a deity). She has a double life, both a woman of Umofia and a priestess, this brings her independence because she has a symbolic role. Chielo symbolises Fate throughout the novel.
 Ogbuefi Ezeudu is one of the elders of Umuofia.
 Mr. Brown is an English missionary who comes to Umuofia. He shows kindness and compassion towards the villagers and makes an effort to understand the Igbo beliefs.
Mr. Smith is another English missionary sent to Umuofia to replace Mr. Brown after he falls ill. In stark contrast to his predecessor, he remains strict and zealous towards the Africans.
 Ms. Gibson is the assistant to the English missionary, Mr. Smith. She shares qualities similar to those of Mr. Smith, however has a limited role in the novel.

Background
The title is a quotation from "The Second Coming", a poem by W. B. Yeats.

Most of the story takes place in the fictional village of Iguedo, which is in the Umuofia clan. The place name Iguedo is only mentioned three times in the novel. Achebe more frequently uses the name Umuofia to refer to Okonkwo's home village of Iguedo. Umuofia is located west of the actual city of Onitsha, on the east bank of the Niger River in Nigeria. The events of the novel unfold in the 1890s. The culture depicted, that of the Igbo people, is similar to that of Achebe's birthplace of Ogidi, where Igbo-speaking people lived together in groups of independent villages ruled by titled elders. The customs described in the novel mirror those of the actual Onitsha people, who lived near Ogidi, and with whom Achebe was familiar.

Within forty years of the colonization of Nigeria, by the time Achebe was born in 1930, the missionaries were well established. He was influenced by Western culture but he refused to change his Igbo name Chinua to Albert.  Achebe's father Isaiah was among the first to be converted in Ogidi, around the turn of the century. Isaiah Achebe himself was an orphan raised by his grandfather. His grandfather, far from opposing Isaiah's conversion to Christianity, allowed his Christian marriage to be celebrated in his compound.

Language choice
Achebe wrote his novels in English because the written standard Igbo language was created by combining various dialects, creating a stilted written form. In a 1994 interview with The Paris Review, Achebe said, "the novel form seems to go with the English language. There is a problem with the Igbo language. It suffers from a very serious inheritance which it received at the beginning of this century from the Anglican mission. They sent out a missionary by the name of Dennis. Archdeacon Dennis. He was a scholar. He had this notion that the Igbo language—which had very many different dialects—should somehow manufacture a uniform dialect that would be used in writing to avoid all these different dialects. Because the missionaries were powerful, what they wanted to do they did. This became the law. But the standard version cannot sing. There's nothing you can do with it to make it sing. It's heavy. It's wooden. It doesn't go anywhere."

Achebe's choice to write in English has caused controversy. While both African and non-African critics agree that Achebe modelled Things Fall Apart on classic European literature, they disagree about whether his novel upholds a Western model, or, in fact, subverts or confronts it. Achebe continued to defend his decision: "English is something you spend your lifetime acquiring, so it would be foolish not to use it. Also, in the logic of colonization and decolonization it is actually a very powerful weapon in the fight to regain what was yours. English was the language of colonization itself. It is not simply something you use because you have it anyway."

Achebe is noted for his inclusion of and weaving in of proverbs from Igbo oral culture into his writing. This influence was explicitly referenced by Achebe in Things Fall Apart: "Among the Igbo the art of conversation is regarded very highly, and proverbs are the palm-oil with which words are eaten."

Literary significance and reception
Things Fall Apart is regarded as a milestone in African literature. It has come to be seen as the archetypal modern African novel in English, and is read in Nigeria and throughout Africa. It is studied widely in Europe, India, and North America, where it has spawned numerous secondary and tertiary analytical works. It has achieved similar status and repute in Australia and Oceania. Considered Achebe's magnum opus, it has sold more than 20 million copies worldwide. Time magazine included the novel in its TIME 100 Best English-language Novels from 1923 to 2005. The novel has been translated into more than 50 languages, and is often used in literature, world history, and African studies courses across the world.

Achebe is now considered to be the essential novelist on African identity, nationalism, and decolonization. Achebe's main focus has been cultural ambiguity and contestation. The complexity of novels such as Things Fall Apart depends on Achebe's ability to bring competing cultural systems and their languages to the same level of representation, dialogue, and contestation.

Reviewers have praised Achebe's neutral narration and have described Things Fall Apart as a realistic novel. Much of the critical discussion about Things Fall Apart concentrates on the socio-political aspects of the novel, including the friction between the members of Igbo society as they confront the intrusive and overpowering presence of Western government and beliefs. Ernest N. Emenyonu commented that "Things Fall Apart is indeed a classic study of cross-cultural misunderstanding and the consequences to the rest of humanity, when a belligerent culture or civilization, out of sheer arrogance and ethnocentrism, takes it upon itself to invade another culture, another civilization."

Achebe's writing about African society, in telling from an African point of view the story of the colonization of the Igbo, tends to extinguish the conception that African culture had been savage and primitive. In Things Fall Apart, western culture is portrayed as being "arrogant and ethnocentric," insisting that the African culture needed a leader. As it had no kings or chiefs, Umuofian culture was vulnerable to invasion by western civilization. It is felt that the repression of the Igbo language at the end of the novel contributes greatly to the destruction of the culture. Although Achebe favours the African culture of the pre-western society, the author attributes its destruction to the "weaknesses within the native structure." Achebe portrays the culture as having a religion, a government, a system of money, and an artistic tradition, as well as a judicial system.

Influence and legacy
The publication of Achebe's Things Fall Apart helped pave the way for numerous other African writers. Novelists who published after Achebe were able to find an eloquent and effective mode for the expression of the particular social, historical, and cultural situation of modern Africa. Before Things Fall Apart was published, most of the novels about Africa had been written by European authors, portraying Africans as savages who were in need of western enlightenment.

Achebe broke from this outsider view, by portraying Igbo society in a sympathetic light.  This allows the reader to examine the effects of European colonialism from a different perspective. He commented: "The popularity of Things Fall Apart in my own society can be explained simply ... this was the first time we were seeing ourselves, as autonomous individuals, rather than half-people, or as Conrad would say, 'rudimentary souls'." Nigerian Nobel laureate Wole Soyinka has described the work as "the first novel in English which spoke from the interior of the African character, rather than portraying the African as an exotic, as the white man would see him."

The language of the novel has not only intrigued critics but has also been a major factor in the emergence of the modern African novel. Because Achebe wrote in English, portrayed Igbo life from the point of view of an African man, and used the language of his people, he was able to greatly influence African novelists, who viewed him as a mentor.
 
Achebe's fiction and criticism continue to inspire and influence writers around the world. Hilary Mantel, the Booker Prize-winning novelist in a 7 May 2012 article in Newsweek, "Hilary Mantel's Favorite Historical Fictions", lists Things Fall Apart as one of her five favourite novels in this genre. A whole new generation of African writers – Caine Prize winners Binyavanga Wainaina (current director of the Chinua Achebe Center at Bard College) and Helon Habila (Waiting for an Angel [2004] and Measuring Time [2007]), as well as Uzodinma Iweala (Beasts of No Nation [2005]), and  Professor Okey Ndibe (Arrows of Rain [2000]) count Chinua Achebe as a significant influence. Chimamanda Ngozi Adichie, the author of the popular and critically acclaimed novels Purple Hibiscus (2003) and Half of a Yellow Sun (2006), commented in a 2006 interview: "Chinua Achebe will always be important to me because his work influenced not so much my style as my writing philosophy: reading him emboldened me, gave me permission to write about the things I knew well."

Things Fall Apart was listed by Encyclopædia Britannica as one of "12 Novels Considered the 'Greatest Book Ever Written.

The 60th anniversary of the first publication of Things Fall Apart was celebrated at the South Bank Centre in London, UK, on 15 April 2018 with live readings from the book by Femi Elufowoju Jr, Adesua Etomi, Yomi Sode, Lucian Msamati, Jennifer Nansubuga Makumbi, Chibundu Onuzo, Ellah Wakatama Allfrey, Ben Okri, and Margaret Busby.

On November 5, 2019, the BBC News listed Things Fall Apart on its list of the 100 most influential novels.

Film, television, music and theatrical adaptations
A radio drama called Okonkwo was made of the novel in April 1961 by the Nigerian Broadcasting Corporation. It featured Wole Soyinka in a supporting role.

In 1970, the novel was made into a film starring Princess Elizabeth of Toro, Johnny Sekka and Orlando Martins by Francis Oladele and Wolf Schmidt, executive producers Hollywood lawyer Edward Mosk and his wife Fern, who wrote the screenplay. Directed by Jason Pohland.

In 1987, the book was made into a very successful miniseries directed by David Orere and broadcast on Nigerian television by the Nigerian Television Authority. It starred several established film actors, including Pete Edochie, Nkem Owoh, and Sam Loco Efe.

In 1999, the American hip-hop band The Roots released their fourth studio album Things Fall Apart in reference to Achebe's novel. A theatrical production of Things Fall Apart, adapted by Biyi Bandele, took place at the Kennedy Center that year as well.

In 2019, the lyrics of "No Holiday for Madiba", a song honouring Nelson Mandela, include the phrase, "things fall apart", in reference to the book's title.

Publication information 
 Achebe, Chinua. The African Trilogy. (London: Everyman's Library, 2010) . Edited with an introduction by Chimamanda Ngozi Adichie. The book collects Things Fall Apart, No Longer at Ease, and Arrow of God in one volume.

See also
Heart of Darkness

Citations 

 Grouped citations

General and cited sources

Further reading
 Achebe, Chinua. Things Fall Apart. New York: Anchor Books, 1994. 
 Baldwin, Gordon. Strange Peoples and Stranger Customs. New York: W. W. Norton and Company Inc, 1967.
 Booker, M. Keith. The Chinua Achebe Encyclopedia. Westport, Conn.: Greenwood Press, 2003. 
 Booker, M. Keith. Things Fall Apart, by Chinua Achebe [Critical Insights]. Pasadena, Calif: Salem Press, 2011. 
 Frazer, Sir James George. The Golden Bough: A Study in Magic and Religion. New York: The Macmillan Company, 1942.
 Girard, Rene. Violence and the Sacred. Trans. Patrick Gregory. Baltimore: Johns Hopkins University Press, 1977. 
 Islam, Md. Manirul. Chinua Achebe's 'Things Fall Apart' and 'No Longer at Ease': Critical Perspectives. Germany: Lambert Academic Publishing, 2019. 
 Rhoads, Diana Akers (September 1993). "Culture in Chinua Achebe's Things Fall Apart". African Studies Review. 36(2): 61–72.
 Roberts, J. M. A Short History of the World. New York: Oxford University Press, 1993.
 Rosenberg, Donna. World Mythology: An Anthology of the Great Myths and Epics. Lincolnwood, Illinois: NTC Publishing Group, 1994.

External links

 Chinua Achebe discusses Things Fall Apart on the BBC World Book Club
 Teacher's Guide at Random House
 A "New English" in Chinua Achebe’s Things Fall Apart
 Study Resource for writing about Things Fall Apart
 Study guide
 Words present in the novel used in past SATs. Includes definitions, words in order from the book, and three different tests.
 Things Fall Apart Reviews
 Things Fall Apart on Wiki Summaries
 Things Fall Apart study guide, themes, analysis, teacher resources
 Things Fall Apart Igbo Culture Guide, Igbo Proverbs
 Things Fall Apart Summary

1958 British novels
1958 Nigerian novels
1958 debut novels
African Writers Series
Fiction about suicide
Heinemann (publisher) books
Historical novels
Nigerian English-language novels
Nigerian novels adapted into films
Novels about suicide
Novels by Chinua Achebe
Novels set in Nigeria
Postcolonial novels